The chimpanzee (Pan troglodytes), also known as simply the chimp, is a species of great ape native to the forest and savannah of tropical Africa. It has four confirmed subspecies and a fifth proposed subspecies. When its close relative the bonobo was more commonly known as the pygmy chimpanzee, this species was often called the common chimpanzee or the robust chimpanzee. The chimpanzee and the bonobo are the only species in the genus Pan. Evidence from fossils and DNA sequencing shows that Pan is a sister taxon to the human lineage and is humans' closest living relative. The chimpanzee is covered in coarse black hair, but has a bare face, fingers, toes, palms of the hands, and soles of the feet.

The chimpanzee lives in groups that range in size from 15 to 150 members, although individuals travel and forage in much smaller groups during the day. The species lives in a strict male-dominated hierarchy, where disputes are generally settled without the need for violence. Nearly all chimpanzee populations have been recorded using tools, modifying sticks, rocks, grass and leaves and using them for hunting and acquiring honey, termites, ants, nuts and water. The species has also been found creating sharpened sticks to spear small mammals. Its gestation period is eight months. The infant is weaned at about three years old but usually maintains a close relationship with its mother for several years more.

The chimpanzee is listed on the IUCN Red List as an endangered species. Between 170,000 and 300,000 individuals are estimated across its range. The biggest threats to the chimpanzee are habitat loss, poaching, and disease. Chimpanzees appear in Western popular culture as stereotyped clown-figures and have featured in entertainments such as chimpanzees' tea parties, circus acts and stage shows. Although many chimpanzees have been kept as pets, their strength, aggressiveness, and unpredictability makes them dangerous in this role. Some hundreds have been kept in laboratories for research, especially in the United States. Many attempts have been made to teach languages such as American Sign Language to chimpanzees, with limited success.

Etymology
The English word chimpanzee is first recorded in 1738. It is derived from Vili ci-mpenze or Tshiluba language chimpenze, with a meaning of "ape". The colloquialism "chimp" was most likely coined some time in the late 1870s. The genus name Pan derives from the Greek god, while the specific name troglodytes was taken from the Troglodytae, a mythical race of cave-dwellers.

Taxonomy and genetics
The first great ape known to Western science in the 17th century was the "orang-outang" (genus Pongo), the local Malay name being recorded in Java by the Dutch physician Jacobus Bontius. In 1641, the Dutch anatomist Nicolaes Tulp applied the name to a chimpanzee or bonobo brought to the Netherlands from Angola. Another Dutch anatomist, Peter Camper, dissected specimens from Central Africa and Southeast Asia in the 1770s, noting the differences between the African and Asian apes. The German naturalist Johann Friedrich Blumenbach classified the chimpanzee as Simia troglodytes by 1775. Another German naturalist, Lorenz Oken, coined the genus Pan in 1816. The bonobo was recognised as distinct from the chimpanzee by 1933.

Evolution

Despite a large number of Homo fossil finds, Pan fossils were not described until 2005. Existing chimpanzee populations in West and Central Africa do not overlap with the major human fossil sites in East Africa, but chimpanzee fossils have now been reported from Kenya. This indicates that both humans and members of the Pan clade were present in the East African Rift Valley during the Middle Pleistocene.

DNA evidence suggests the bonobo and chimpanzee species separated from each other less than one million years ago (similar in relation between Homo sapiens and Neanderthals). A 2017 genetic study suggests ancient gene flow (introgression) between 200 and 550 thousand years ago from the bonobo into the ancestors of central and eastern chimpanzees. The chimpanzee line split from the last common ancestor of the human line around six million years ago. Because no species other than Homo sapiens has survived from the human line of that branching, both chimpanzee species are the closest living relatives of humans; the lineage of humans and chimpanzees diverged from gorillas (genus Gorilla) about seven million years ago. A 2003 study argues the chimpanzee should be included in the human branch as Homo troglodytes and notes "experts say many scientists are likely to resist the reclassification, especially in the emotionally-charged and often disputed field of anthropology".

Subspecies and population status

Four subspecies of the chimpanzee have been recognised, with the possibility of a fifth:
 Central chimpanzee or the tschego (Pan troglodytes troglodytes), found in Cameroon, the Central African Republic, Equatorial Guinea, Gabon, the Republic of the Congo, and the Democratic Republic of the Congo, with about 140,000 individuals existing in the wild.
 Western chimpanzee (P. troglodytes verus), found in Ivory Coast, Guinea, Liberia, Mali, Sierra Leone, Guinea-Bissau, Senegal, and Ghana with about 52,800 individuals still in existence.
 Nigeria-Cameroon chimpanzee (P. troglodytes ellioti (also known as P. t. vellerosus)), that live within forested areas across Nigeria and Cameroon, with 6000–9000 individuals still in existence.
 Eastern chimpanzee (P. troglodytes schweinfurthii), found in the Central African Republic, South Sudan, the Democratic Republic of the Congo, Uganda, Rwanda, Burundi, Tanzania, and Zambia, with approximately 180,000–256,000 individuals still existing in the wild.
 Southeastern chimpanzee, P. troglodytes marungensis, in Burundi, Rwanda, Tanzania, and Uganda. Colin Groves argues that this is a subspecies, created by enough variation between the northern and southern populations of P. t. schweinfurthii, but it is not recognised by the IUCN.

Genome

A draft version of the chimpanzee genome was published in 2005 and encodes 18,759 proteins, (compared to 20,383 in the human proteome). The DNA sequences of humans and chimpanzees are very similar and the difference in protein number mostly arises from incomplete sequences in the chimp genome. Both species differ by about 35 million single-nucleotide changes, five million insertion/deletion events and various chromosomal rearrangements. Typical human and chimpanzee protein homologs differ in an average of only two amino acids. About 30% of all human proteins are identical in sequence to the corresponding chimpanzee protein. Duplications of small parts of chromosomes have been the major source of differences between human and chimpanzee genetic material; about 2.7% of the corresponding modern genomes represent differences, produced by gene duplications or deletions, since humans and chimpanzees diverged from their common evolutionary ancestor.

Characteristics

The chimpanzee is more robustly built than the bonobo but less than the gorilla. The arms of a chimpanzee are longer than its legs and can reach below the knees. The hands have long fingers with short thumbs and flat fingernails. The feet are adapted for grasping, and the big toe is opposable. The pelvis is long with an extended ilium. A chimpanzee's head is rounded with a prominent and prognathous face and a pronounced brow ridge. It has forward-facing eyes, a small nose, rounded non-lobed ears, a long mobile upper lip. Additionally, adult males have sharp canine teeth. Chimpanzees lack the prominent sagittal crest and associated head and neck musculature of gorillas.

Chimpanzee bodies are covered by coarse hair, except for the face, fingers, toes, palms of the hands, and soles of the feet. Chimpanzees lose more hair as they age and develop bald spots. The hair of a chimpanzee is typically black but can be brown or ginger. As they get older, white or grey patches may appear, particularly on the chin and lower region. The skin may range from pale to dark, though females develop swelling pink skin when in oestrus.

Chimpanzees are adapted for both arboreal and terrestrial locomotion. Arboreal locomotion consists of vertical climbing and brachiation. On the ground, chimpanzees move both quadrupedally and bipedally. These movements appear to have similar energy costs. As with bonobos and gorillas, chimpanzees move quadrupedally by knuckle-walking, which probably evolved independently in Pan and Gorilla. The physical strength of chimps is around 1.5 times greater than humans due to higher content of fast twitch muscle fibres, one of the chimpanzee's adaptations for climbing and swinging.

Ecology

The chimpanzee is a highly adaptable species. It lives in a variety of habitats, including dry savanna, evergreen rainforest, montane forest, swamp forest, and dry woodland-savanna mosaic. In Gombe, the chimpanzee mostly uses semideciduous and evergreen forest as well as open woodland. At Bossou, the chimpanzee inhabits multistage secondary deciduous forest, which has grown after shifting cultivation, as well as primary forest and grassland. At Taï, it is found in the last remaining tropical rain forest in Ivory Coast. The chimpanzee has an advanced cognitive map of its home range and can repeatedly find food. The chimpanzee builds a sleeping nest in a tree in a different location each night, never using the same nest more than once. Chimpanzees sleep alone in separate nests except for infants or juvenile chimpanzees, which sleep with their mothers.

Chimpanzees do not appear to directly compete with gorillas in areas where they overlap. When fruit is abundant, gorilla and chimpanzee diets converge, but when fruit is scarce gorillas resort to vegetation. The two apes may also feed on different species, whether fruit or insects. Interactions between the apes can range from friendly and even stable social bonding, to avoidance, to aggression and predation on part of chimpanzees.

Diet

The chimpanzee is an omnivorous frugivore. It prefers fruit above all other food items but also eats leaves, leaf buds, seeds, blossoms, stems, pith, bark, and resin. A study in Budongo Forest, Uganda found that 64.5% of their feeding time concentrated on fruits (84.6% of which being ripe), particularly those from two species of Ficus, Maesopsis eminii, and Celtis gomphophylla. In addition, 19% of feeding time was spent on arboreal leaves, mostly Broussonetia papyrifera and Celtis mildbraedii. While the chimpanzee is mostly herbivorous, it does eat honey, soil, insects, birds and their eggs, and small to medium-sized mammals, including other primates. Insect species consumed include the weaver ant Oecophylla longinoda, Macrotermes termites, and honey bees. The red colobus ranks at the top of preferred mammal prey. Other mammalian prey include red-tailed monkeys, infant and juvenile yellow baboons, bush babies, blue duikers, bushbucks, and common warthogs.

Despite the fact that chimpanzees are known to hunt and to collect both insects and other invertebrates, such food actually makes up a very small portion of their diet, from as little as 2% yearly to as much as 65 grams of animal flesh per day for each adult chimpanzee in peak hunting seasons. This also varies from troop to troop and year to year. However, in all cases, the majority of their diet consists of fruits, leaves, roots, and other plant matter. Female chimpanzees appear to consume much less animal flesh than males, according to several studies. Jane Goodall documented many occasions within Gombe Stream National Park of chimpanzees and western red colobus monkeys ignoring each other despite close proximity.

Mortality and health

The average lifespan of a chimpanzee in the wild is relatively short, usually less than 15 years, although individuals that reach 12 years may live an additional 15 years. On rare occasions, wild chimpanzees may live nearly 60 years. Captive chimpanzees tend to live longer than most wild ones, with median lifespans of 31.7 years for males and 38.7 years for females. The oldest known male captive chimpanzee to have been documented lived to 66 years, and the oldest female, Little Mama, was over 70 years old.

Leopards prey on chimpanzees in some areas. It is possible that much of the mortality caused by leopards can be attributed to individuals that have specialised in chimp-killing. Chimpanzees may react to a leopard's presence with loud vocalising, branch shaking, and throwing objects. There is at least one record of chimpanzees killing a leopard cub after mobbing it and its mother in their den. Four chimpanzees could have fallen prey to lions at Mahale Mountains National Park. Although no other instances of lion predation on chimpanzees have been recorded, lions likely do kill chimpanzees occasionally, and the larger group sizes of savanna chimpanzees may have developed as a response to threats from these big cats. Chimpanzees may react to lions by fleeing up trees, vocalising, or hiding in silence.

Chimpanzees and humans share only 50% of their parasite and microbe species. This is due to the differences in environmental and dietary adaptations; human internal parasite species overlap more with omnivorous, savanna-dwelling baboons. The chimpanzee is host to the louse species Pediculus schaeffi, a close relative of P. humanus, which infests human head and body hair. By contrast, the human pubic louse Pthirus pubis is closely related to Pthirus gorillae, which infests gorillas. A 2017 study of gastrointestinal parasites of wild chimpanzees in degraded forest in Uganda found nine species of protozoa, five nematodes, one cestode, and one trematode. The most prevalent species was the protozoan Troglodytella abrassarti.

Behaviour
Recent studies have suggested that human observers influence chimpanzee behaviour. One suggestion is that drones, camera traps, and remote microphones should be used to record and monitor chimpanzees rather than direct human observation.

Group structure

Chimpanzees live in communities that typically range from around 20 to more than 150 members but spend most of their time traveling in small, temporary groups consisting of a few individuals. These groups may consist of any combination of age and sexes. Both males and females sometimes travel alone. This fission-fusion society may include groups of four types: all-male, adult females and offspring, adults of both sexes, or one female and her offspring. These smaller groups emerge in a variety of types, for a variety of purposes. For example, an all-male troop may be organised to hunt for meat, while a group consisting of lactating females serves to act as a "nursery group" for the young.

At the core of social structures are males, which patrol the territory, protect group members, and search for food. Males remain in their natal communities, while females generally emigrate at adolescence. Males in a community are more likely to be related to one another than females are to each other. Among males, there is generally a dominance hierarchy, and males are dominant over females. However, this unusual fission-fusion social structure, "in which portions of the parent group may on a regular basis separate from and then rejoin the rest," is highly variable in terms of which particular individual chimpanzees congregate at a given time. This is caused mainly by the large measure of individual autonomy that individuals have within their fission-fusion social groups. As a result, individual chimpanzees often forage for food alone, or in smaller groups, as opposed to the much larger "parent" group, which encompasses all the chimpanzees which regularly come into contact with each other and congregate into parties in a particular area.

Male chimpanzees exist in a linear dominance hierarchy. Top-ranking males tend to be aggressive even during dominance stability. This is probably due to the chimpanzee's fission-fusion society, with male chimpanzees leaving groups and returning after extended periods of time. With this, a dominant male is unsure if any "political maneuvering" has occurred in his absence and must re-establish his dominance. Thus, a large amount of aggression occurs within five to fifteen minutes after a reunion. During these encounters, displays of aggression are generally preferred over physical attacks.

Males maintain and improve their social ranks by forming coalitions, which have been characterised as "exploitative" and based on an individual's influence in agonistic interactions. Being in a coalition allows males to dominate a third individual when they could not by themselves, as politically apt chimpanzees can exert power over aggressive interactions regardless of their rank. Coalitions can also give an individual male the confidence to challenge a dominant or larger male. The more allies a male has, the better his chance of becoming dominant. However, most changes in hierarchical rank are caused by dyadic interactions. Chimpanzee alliances can be very fickle, and one member may suddenly turn on another if it is to his advantage.

Low-ranking males frequently switch sides in disputes between more dominant individuals. Low-ranking males benefit from an unstable hierarchy and often find increased sexual opportunities if a dispute or conflict occurs. In addition, conflicts between dominant males cause them to focus on each other rather than the lower-ranking males. Social hierarchies among adult females tend to be weaker. Nevertheless, the status of an adult female may be important for her offspring. Females in Taï have also been recorded to form alliances. While chimpanzee social structure is often referred to as patriarchal, it is not entirely unheard of for females to forge coalitions against males. There is also at least one recorded case of females securing a dominant position over males in their respective troop, albeit in a captive environment. Social grooming appears to be important in the formation and maintenance of coalitions. It is more common among adult males than either between adult females or between males and females.

Chimpanzees have been described as highly territorial and will frequently kill other chimpanzees, although Margaret Power wrote in her 1991 book The Egalitarians that the field studies from which the aggressive data came, Gombe and Mahale, used artificial feeding systems that increased aggression in the chimpanzee populations studied. Thus, the behaviour may not reflect innate characteristics of the species as a whole. In the years following her artificial feeding conditions at Gombe, Jane Goodall described groups of male chimpanzees patrolling the borders of their territory, brutally attacking chimpanzees that had split off from the Gombe group. A study published in 2010 found that the chimpanzees wage wars over territory, not mates. Patrols from smaller groups are more likely to avoid contact with their neighbours. Patrols from large groups even take over a smaller group's territory, gaining access to more resources, food, and females. While it was traditionally accepted that only female chimpanzees immigrate and males remain in their natal troop for life, there are confirmed cases of adult males safely integrating themselves into new communities among West African chimpanzees, suggesting they are less territorial than other subspecies.

Mating and parenting

Chimpanzees mate throughout the year, although the number of females in oestrus varies seasonally in a group. Female chimpanzees are more likely to come into oestrus when food is readily available. Oestrous females exhibit sexual swellings. Chimpanzees are promiscuous: during oestrus, females mate with several males in their community, while males have large testicles for sperm competition. Other forms of mating also exist. A community's dominant males sometimes restrict reproductive access to females. A male and female can form a consortship and mate outside their community. In addition, females sometimes leave their community and mate with males from neighboring communities.

These alternative mating strategies give females more mating opportunities without losing the support of the males in their community. Infanticide has been recorded in chimpanzee communities in some areas, and the victims are often consumed. Male chimpanzees practice infanticide on unrelated young to shorten the interbirth intervals in the females. Females sometimes practice infanticide. This may be related to the dominance hierarchy in females or may simply be pathological.

Copulation is brief, lasting approximately seven seconds. The gestation period is eight months. Care for the young is provided mostly by their mothers. The survival and emotional health of the young is dependent on maternal care. Mothers provide their young with food, warmth, and protection, and teach them certain skills. In addition, a chimpanzee's future rank may be dependent on its mother's status. Newborn chimpanzees are helpless. For example, their grasping reflex is not strong enough to support them for more than a few seconds. For their first 30 days, infants cling to their mother's bellies. Infants are unable to support their own weight for their first two months and need their mothers' support.

When they reach five to six months, infants ride on their mothers' backs. They remain in continual contact for the rest of their first year. When they reach two years of age, they are able to move and sit independently and start moving beyond the arms' reach of their mothers. By four to six years, chimpanzees are weaned and infancy ends. The juvenile period for chimpanzees lasts from their sixth to ninth years. Juveniles remain close to their mothers, but interact an increasing amount with other members of their community. Adolescent females move between groups and are supported by their mothers in agonistic encounters. Adolescent males spend time with adult males in social activities like hunting and boundary patrolling. A captive study suggests males can safely immigrate to a new group if accompanied by immigrant females who have an existing relationship with this male. This gives the resident males reproductive advantages with these females, as they are more inclined to remain in the group if their male friend is also accepted.

Communication

Chimpanzees use facial expressions, postures, and sounds to communicate with each other. Chimpanzees have expressive faces that are important in close-up communications. When frightened, a "full closed grin" causes nearby individuals to be fearful, as well. Playful chimpanzees display an open-mouthed grin. Chimpanzees may also express themselves with the "pout", which is made in distress, the "sneer", which is made when threatening or fearful, and "compressed-lips face", which is a type of display. When submitting to a dominant individual, a chimpanzee crunches, bobs, and extends a hand. When in an aggressive mode, a chimpanzee swaggers bipedally, hunched over and arms waving, in an attempt to exaggerate its size. While travelling, chimpanzees keep in contact by beating their hands and feet against the trunks of large trees, an act that is known as "drumming". They also do this when encountering individuals from other communities.

Vocalisations are also important in chimpanzee communication. The most common call in adults is the "pant-hoot", which may signal social rank and bond along with keeping groups together. Pant-hoots are made of four parts, starting with soft "hoos", the introduction; that gets louder and louder, the build-up; and climax into screams and sometimes barks; these die down back to soft "hoos" during the letdown phase as the call ends. Grunting is made in situations like feeding and greeting. Submissive individuals make "pant-grunts" towards their superiors. Whimpering is made by young chimpanzees as a form of begging or when lost from the group. Chimpanzees use distance calls to draw attention to danger, food sources, or other community members. "Barks" may be made as "short barks" when hunting and "tonal barks" when sighting large snakes.

Hunting
When hunting small monkeys such as the red colobus, chimpanzees hunt where the forest canopy is interrupted or irregular. This allows them to easily corner the monkeys when chasing them in the appropriate direction. Chimpanzees may also hunt as a coordinated team, so that they can corner their prey even in a continuous canopy. During an arboreal hunt, each chimpanzee in the hunting groups has a role. "Drivers" serve to keep the prey running in a certain direction and follow them without attempting to make a catch. "Blockers" are stationed at the bottom of the trees and climb up to block prey that takes off in a different direction. "Chasers" move quickly and try to make a catch. Finally, "ambushers" hide and rush out when a monkey nears. While both adults and infants are taken, adult male colobus monkeys will attack the hunting chimps. Male chimpanzees hunt more than females. When caught and killed, the meal is distributed to all hunting party members and even bystanders.

Intelligence and cognition

Chimpanzees display numerous signs of intelligence, from the ability to remember symbols to cooperation, tool use, and perhaps language. They are among species that have passed the mirror test, suggesting self-awareness. In one study, two young chimpanzees showed retention of mirror self-recognition after one year without access to mirrors. Chimpanzees have been observed to use insects to treat their own wounds and those of others. They catch them and apply them directly to the injury. Chimpanzees also display signs of culture among groups, with the learning and transmission of variations in grooming, tool use and foraging techniques leading to localized traditions.

A 30-year study at Kyoto University's Primate Research Institute has shown that chimpanzees are able to learn to recognise the numbers 1 to 9 and their values. The chimpanzees further show an aptitude for eidetic memory, demonstrated in experiments in which the jumbled digits are flashed onto a computer screen for less than a quarter of a second. One chimpanzee, Ayumu, was able to correctly and quickly point to the positions where they appeared in ascending order. Ayumu performed better than human adults who were given the same test.

In controlled experiments on cooperation, chimpanzees show a basic understanding of cooperation, and recruit the best collaborators. In a group setting with a device that delivered food rewards only to cooperating chimpanzees, cooperation first increased, then, due to competitive behaviour, decreased, before finally increasing to the highest level through punishment and other arbitrage behaviours.

Great apes show laughter-like vocalisations in response to physical contact, such as wrestling, play chasing, or tickling. This is documented in wild and captive chimpanzees. Chimpanzee laughter is not readily recognisable to humans as such, because it is generated by alternating inhalations and exhalations that sound more like breathing and panting. Instances in which nonhuman primates have expressed joy have been reported. Humans and chimpanzees share similar ticklish areas of the body, such as the armpits and belly. The enjoyment of tickling in chimpanzees does not diminish with age.

Chimpanzees have displayed different behaviours in response to a dying or dead group member. When witnessing a sudden death, the other group members act in frenzy, with vocalisations, aggressive displays, and touching of the corpse. In one case chimpanzees cared for a dying elder, then attended and cleaned the corpse. Afterward, they avoided the spot where the elder died and behaved in a more subdued manner. Mothers have been reported to carry around and groom their dead infants for several days.

Experimenters now and then witness behaviour that cannot be readily reconciled with chimpanzee intelligence or theory of mind. Wolfgang Köhler, for instance, reported insightful behaviour in chimpanzees, but he likewise often observed that they experienced "special difficulty" in solving simple problems. Researchers also reported that, when faced with a choice between two persons, chimpanzees were just as likely to beg food from a person who could see the begging gesture as from a person who could not, thereby raising the possibility that chimpanzees lack theory of mind.

Tool use

Nearly all chimpanzee populations have been recorded using tools. They modify sticks, rocks, grass, and leaves and use them when foraging for termites and ants, nuts, honey, algae or water. Despite the lack of complexity, forethought and skill are apparent in making these tools. Chimpanzees have used stone tools since at least 4,300 years ago.

A chimpanzee from the Kasakela chimpanzee community was the first nonhuman animal reported making a tool, by modifying a twig to use as an instrument for extracting termites from their mound. At Taï, chimpanzees simply use their hands to extract termites. When foraging for honey, chimpanzees use modified short sticks to scoop the honey out of the hive if the bees are stingless. For hives of the dangerous African honeybees, chimpanzees use longer and thinner sticks to extract the honey.

Chimpanzees also fish for ants using the same tactic. Ant dipping is difficult and some chimpanzees never master it. West African chimpanzees crack open hard nuts with stones or branches. Some forethought in this activity is apparent, as these tools are not found together or where the nuts are collected. Nut cracking is also difficult and must be learned. Chimpanzees also use leaves as sponges or spoons to drink water.

West African chimpanzees in Senegal were found to sharpen sticks with their teeth, which were then used to spear Senegal bushbabies out of small holes in trees. An eastern chimpanzee has been observed using a modified branch as a tool to capture a squirrel.

Whilst experimental studies on captive chimpanzees have found that many of their species-typical tool-use behaviours can be individually learnt by each chimpanzees, a 2021 study on their abilities to make and use stone flakes, in a similar way as hypothesised for early hominins, did not find this behaviour across two populations of chimpanzees - suggesting that this behaviour is outside the chimpanzee species-typical range.

Language

Scientists have attempted to teach human language to several species of great ape. One early attempt by Allen and Beatrix Gardner in the 1960s involved spending 51 months teaching American Sign Language to a chimpanzee named Washoe. The Gardners reported that Washoe learned 151 signs, and had spontaneously taught them to other chimpanzees, including her adopted son, Loulis. Over a longer period of time, Washoe was reported to have learned over 350 signs.

Debate is ongoing among scientists such as David Premack about chimpanzees' ability to learn language. Since the early reports on Washoe, numerous other studies have been conducted, with varying levels of success. One involved a chimpanzee jokingly named Nim Chimpsky (in allusion to the theorist of language Noam Chomsky), trained by Herbert Terrace of Columbia University. Although his initial reports were quite positive, in November 1979, Terrace and his team, including psycholinguist Thomas Bever, re-evaluated the videotapes of Nim with his trainers, analyzing them frame by frame for signs, as well as for exact context (what was happening both before and after Nim's signs). In the reanalysis, Terrace and Bever concluded that Nim's utterances could be explained merely as prompting on the part of the experimenters, as well as mistakes in reporting the data. "Much of the apes' behaviour is pure drill", he said. "Language still stands as an important definition of the human species." In this reversal, Terrace now argued Nim's use of ASL was not like human language acquisition. Nim never initiated conversations himself, rarely introduced new words, and mostly imitated what the humans did. More importantly, Nim's word strings varied in their ordering, suggesting that he was incapable of syntax. Nim's sentences also did not grow in length, unlike human children whose vocabulary and sentence length show a strong positive correlation.

Relations with humans

In culture

Chimpanzees are rarely represented in African culture, as people find their resemblance to humans discomforting. The Gio people of Liberia and the Hemba people of the Congo have created masks of the animals. Gio masks are crude and blocky, and worn when teaching young people how not to behave. The Hemba masks have a smile that suggests drunken anger, insanity or horror and are worn during rituals at funerals, representing the "awful reality of death". The masks may also serve to guard households and protect both human and plant fertility. Stories have been told of chimpanzees kidnapping and raping women.

In Western popular culture, chimpanzees have occasionally been stereotyped as childlike companions, sidekicks or clowns. They are especially suited for the latter role on account of their prominent facial features, long limbs and fast movements, which humans often find amusing. Accordingly, entertainment acts featuring chimpanzees dressed up as humans with lip-synchronised human voices have been traditional staples of circuses, stage shows and TV shows like Lancelot Link, Secret Chimp (1970-1972) and The Chimp Channel (1999). From 1926 until 1972, London Zoo, followed by several other zoos around the world, held a chimpanzees' tea party daily, inspiring a long-running series of advertisements for PG Tips tea featuring such a party. Animal rights groups have urged a stop to such acts, considering them abusive.

Chimpanzees in media include Judy on the television series Daktari in the 1960s and Darwin on The Wild Thornberrys in the 1990s. In contrast to the fictional depictions of other animals, such as dogs (as in Lassie), dolphins (Flipper), horses (The Black Stallion) or even other great apes (King Kong), chimpanzee characters and actions are rarely relevant to the plot. Depictions of chimpanzees as individuals rather than stock characters, and as central rather than incidental to the plot can be found in science fiction. Robert A. Heinlein's 1947 short story "Jerry Was a Man" concerns a genetically enhanced chimpanzee suing for better treatment. The 1972 film Conquest of the Planet of the Apes, the third sequel of the 1968 film Planet of the Apes, portrays a futuristic revolt of enslaved apes led by the only talking chimpanzee, Caesar, against their human masters.

As pets
Chimpanzees have traditionally been kept as pets in a few African villages, especially in the Democratic Republic of Congo. In Virunga National Park in the east of the country, the park authorities regularly confiscate chimpanzees from people keeping them as pets. Outside their range, chimpanzees are popular as exotic pets despite their strength and aggression. Even where keeping non-human primates as pets is illegal, the exotic pet trade continues to prosper, leading to injuries from attacks.

Use in research

Hundreds of chimpanzees have been kept in laboratories for research. Most such laboratories either conduct or make the animals available for invasive research, defined as "inoculation with an infectious agent, surgery or biopsy conducted for the sake of research and not for the sake of the chimpanzee, and/or drug testing". Research chimpanzees tend to be used repeatedly over decades for up to 40 years, unlike the pattern of use of most laboratory animals. Two federally funded American laboratories use chimpanzees: the Yerkes National Primate Research Center at Emory University in Atlanta, Georgia, and the Southwest National Primate Center in San Antonio, Texas. Five hundred chimpanzees have been retired from laboratory use in the U.S. and live in animal sanctuaries in the U.S. or Canada.

A five-year moratorium was imposed by the US National Institutes of Health in 1996, because too many chimpanzees had been bred for HIV research, and it has been extended annually since 2001. With the publication of the chimpanzee genome, plans to increase the use of chimpanzees in America were reportedly increasing in 2006, some scientists arguing that the federal moratorium on breeding chimpanzees for research should be lifted. However, in 2007, the NIH made the moratorium permanent.

Other researchers argue that chimpanzees either should not be used in research, or should be treated differently, for instance with legal status as persons. Pascal Gagneux, an evolutionary biologist and primate expert at the University of California, San Diego, argues, given chimpanzees' sense of self, tool use, and genetic similarity to human beings, studies using chimpanzees should follow the ethical guidelines used for human subjects unable to give consent. A recent study suggests chimpanzees which are retired from labs exhibit a form of post-traumatic stress disorder. Stuart Zola, director of the Yerkes laboratory, disagrees. He told National Geographic: "I don't think we should make a distinction between our obligation to treat humanely any species, whether it's a rat or a monkey or a chimpanzee. No matter how much we may wish it, chimps are not human."

Only one European laboratory, the Biomedical Primate Research Centre in Rijswijk, the Netherlands, used chimpanzees in research. It formerly held 108 chimpanzees among 1,300 non-human primates. The Dutch ministry of science decided to phase out research at the centre from 2001. Trials already under way were however allowed to run their course. Chimpanzees including the female Ai have been studied at the Primate Research Institute of Kyoto University, Japan, formerly directed by Tetsuro Matsuzawa, since 1978. Some 12 chimpanzees are currently held at the facility.

Two chimpanzees have been sent into outer space as NASA research subjects. Ham, the first great ape in space, was launched in the Mercury-Redstone 2 capsule on 31 January 1961, and survived the suborbital flight. Enos, the third primate to orbit Earth after Soviet cosmonauts Yuri Gagarin and Gherman Titov, flew on Mercury-Atlas 5 on 29 November of the same year.

Field study

Jane Goodall undertook the first long-term field study of the chimpanzee, begun in Tanzania at Gombe Stream National Park in 1960. Other long-term studies begun in the 1960s include A. Kortlandt's in the eastern Democratic Republic of the Congo and Toshisada Nishida's in Mahale Mountains National Park in Tanzania. Current understanding of the species' typical behaviours and social organisation has been formed largely from Goodall's ongoing 60-year Gombe research study.

Attacks
Chimpanzees have attacked humans. In Uganda, several attacks on children have happened, some of them fatal. Some of these attacks may have been due to the chimpanzees being intoxicated (from alcohol obtained from rural brewing operations) and becoming aggressive towards humans. Human interactions with chimpanzees may be especially dangerous if the chimpanzees perceive humans as potential rivals. At least six cases of chimpanzees snatching and eating human babies are documented.

A chimpanzee's strength and sharp teeth mean that attacks, even on adult humans, can cause severe injuries. This was evident after the attack and near death of former NASCAR driver St. James Davis, who was mauled by two escaped chimpanzees (in the St. James Davis Chimpanzee Attack) while he and his wife were celebrating the birthday of their former pet chimpanzee.

Human immunodeficiency virus
Two primary classes of human immunodeficiency virus (HIV) infect humans: HIV-1 and HIV-2. HIV-1 is the more virulent and easily transmitted, and is the source of the majority of HIV infections throughout the world; HIV-2 is largely confined to west Africa. Both types originated in west and central Africa, jumping from other primates to humans. HIV-1 has evolved from a simian immunodeficiency virus (SIVcpz) found in the subspecies P. t. troglodytes of southern Cameroon. Kinshasa, in the Democratic Republic of Congo, has the greatest genetic diversity of HIV-1 so far discovered, suggesting the virus has been there longer than anywhere else. HIV-2 crossed species from a different strain of HIV, found in the sooty mangabey monkeys in Guinea-Bissau.

Status and conservation

The chimpanzee is on the IUCN Red List as an endangered species. Chimpanzees are legally protected in most of their range and are found both in and outside national parks. Between 172,700 and 299,700 individuals are thought to be living in the wild, a decrease from about a million chimpanzees in the early 1900s. Chimpanzees are listed in Appendix I of the Convention on International Trade in Endangered Species (CITES), meaning that commercial international trade in wild-sourced specimens is prohibited and all other international trade (including in parts and derivatives) is regulated by the CITES permitting system.

The biggest threats to the chimpanzee are habitat destruction, poaching, and disease. Chimpanzee habitats have been limited by deforestation in both West and Central Africa. Road building has caused habitat degradation and fragmentation of chimpanzee populations and may allow poachers more access to areas that had not been seriously affected by humans. Although deforestation rates are low in western Central Africa, selective logging may take place outside national parks.

Chimpanzees are a common target for poachers. In Ivory Coast, chimpanzees make up 1–3% of bushmeat sold in urban markets. They are also taken, often illegally, for the pet trade and are hunted for medicinal purposes in some areas. Farmers sometimes kill chimpanzees that threaten their crops; others are unintentionally maimed or killed by snares meant for other animals.

Infectious diseases are a main cause of death for chimpanzees. They succumb to many diseases that afflict humans because the two species are so similar. As human populations grow, so does the risk of disease transmission between humans and chimpanzees.

See also

 
 
 
 
 
 One Small Step: The Story of the Space Chimps, 2008 documentary
 Chimpanzee, 2012 documentary
 Great Ape Project
 International Primate Day

Notes

References

Literature cited

External links

 DiscoverChimpanzees.org
 Chimpanzee Genome resources
 Primate Info Net Pan troglodytes Factsheets 
 U.S. Fish & Wildlife Service Species Profile
 View the Pan troglodytes genome in Ensembl
 Genome of Pan troglodytes (version Clint_PTRv2/panTro6), via UCSC Genome Browser
 Data of the genome of Pan troglodytes, via NCBI
 Data of the genome assembly of Pan troglodytes Clint_PTRv2/panTro6, via NCBI
 Human Timeline (Interactive) – Smithsonian, National Museum of Natural History (August 2016).

chimpanzee
Tool-using mammals
Primates of Africa
Extant Pliocene first appearances
Fauna of Sub-Saharan Africa
chimpanzee
chimpanzee
Articles containing video clips